2x2 is a Russian television channel. Founded in 1989, it was the first commercial TV station in the Soviet Union (USSR). The channel shut down in 1997, and resumed broadcasting in 2003. Since then, the channel has predominantly broadcast foreign animated TV series, including children's television series, anime and adult animation shows (similar to the American channel Adult Swim).

The channel has 4-hour versions for broadcasting in other regions of Russia (+0 MSK, +2 MSK, +4 MSK, +7 MSK).

The channel began trial broadcasting in July 1989 on the frequency of Moscow Programme of the Central Television, becoming the first commercial channel in the history of the USSR and Russia. Full broadcasting began on 1 November 1989. The network's programming was initially composed of half-hour and more advertising blocks, modern Soviet and Western music videos, cartoons, and TV series. 

Broadcasting of 2x2 on Channel 3 ended on 9 June 1997, moving to the decimeter band, on Channel 51, where it broadcast with extremely low-quality content and had a much greater focus on home shopping. In 2003, the channel shifted to 60 TVK.

Since 1 April 2007, under this name, an animated Russian channel has been broadcasting, aimed at an adult audience 14–44 years old. Its database contains more than 200 titles of various animated series, game shows and feature films. The channel also has its own animation studio.

Since 2014, the channel has been part of the holding company Gazprom-Media. As of April 2017, it employs 45 people. The channel applied for inclusion in the second multiplex of digital terrestrial television in Russia, but failed to win the competition held by the Federal Competition Commission (FCC).

History

Trial period (July — November 1989)

The channel was established by order of the state television and radio broadcasting of the USSR as a structural division within the General Directorate of programs (GDP). The staff initially had 6 people, among them: Sergey Alexandrovich Alekseev (Director), Olga Smirnova, Oleg Shchur (Producer), Olga Lukasik (administrator), in August, Sergey Lavrov joined the team as an artist. Trial broadcasting on 3 channel in Moscow and the Moscow region began in July 1989 under the name "Commercial TV channel". Broadcasting was carried out in the daytime, as in the evening the state "Moscow program CT" was broadcasting on the same frequency. The duration of the broadcasts of the "Commercial TV channel" was not fixed. Music videos of "all She Wants Is" by Duran Duran, "Always on My Mind" by Pet Shop Boys, "Assez!" by Niagara, "Everywhere" by Fleetwood Mac, "Around My Heart" by singer Sandra, "Soldier" by singer Thomas Anders, "Mon mec à moi" by singer Patricia Kaas, "Don't Stop the Dance" by singer Bryan ferry, as well as fragments of the song were broadcast during the commercial.concert of the band space in Moscow. The employees had only a small room No. 115 behind the bar in ask-3 (Olympic TV and radio complex) and two hardware rooms, an on-air and an Assembly room.

1989—1997
The name «2x2» was coined by the team around the end of July 1989, at the same time Sergey Lavrov (the only artist in the team) developed the General style of the TV channel and the original version of the logo, which with minor changes still exists. On November 1, 1989, the channel began broadcasting under its own name on the frequency of "Moscow program CT", later - "MTK". In the evening (from 18:00 to 23:00), the MTK channel was broadcast. The meaning of the name «2x2» at the beginning of the channel's activity was explained as" proportional provision of air for advertising and other programs on the principle of 50×50", due to the fact that advertising there was both a source of funding and a form of functioning.

At the initial stage of work, 2x2 did not have money for the production and purchase of programs, as a result of which the broadcast network was filled with materials obtained thanks to the personal connections and capabilities of its managers. Half-hour and more advertising blocks, an advertising clip of the company "Video international", modern Soviet and foreign music videos and cartoons (in particular, the Soviet TV "Screen") were shown on the air, later (in December 1991) the TV series "Captain Power and soldiers of the future"was shown and then repeated many times. The series "I Spy" was also broadcast. In addition, 2x2 also showed a selection of domestic clips, starting with the clip of Oleg Beskrovny "a knock in the heart" (the main character of this selection was Igor Talkov). Among other videos shown by the channel were clips of the Alla Pugacheva song theater from the Video international company, "Accountant" by the Combination group," Arab gold "by the Forgotten conversation group," love Street "and" Ksenia "by Alena Apina. In the program "Afisha" with DJ Ale-Alena, which also broadcast video clips of Russian artists such as Bogdan Titomir and Oleg Gazmanov. From the first day of broadcast have been broadcast by Sergei Selenourea — "Batalla!".

The lack of a rigid broadcast grid and the format of a six-time repeat of the same block of entertainment programs and advertising, which were the result of limited financial resources and a small number of programs at the disposal of 2x2, largely played a role in the growth of its popularity. The channel broadcast in the format of the so-called "background television", when viewing which the viewer could not pay attention to the picture shown on the screen, or even start watching the TV channel from any moment, without specifically catching this or that TV program. TV sets in offices, shops, cafes and other public places and institutions were often tuned to 2x2. At that time, 2x2 was the only domestic TV channel that often showed music videos, which strongly distinguished it from the General background of several existing Soviet TV channels. The channel was very popular among Soviet schoolchildren, who most often, while waiting for a 20-minute show of music videos, watched advertising blocks that sometimes lasted for 40 minutes without a break. According to a survey of 586 high school students in Moscow schools conducted at the end of 1991, the channel became the leader in popularity: it was watched by 34.16% of respondents.

From June 1990 to 31 May 1992, the channel broadcast programs of the British Super Channel. One of these programs was Blue Night. Their share in the broadcast network almost immediately became impressive-one-or two-hour selections of video clips were broadcast (the program All Mixed hit parade SPIN WIN, made up of modern popular clips), thematic programs (music, fashion, sports), movies. Some educational programs were also broadcast, including those produced by the Discovery Channel, including "After 2000".

Since mid-1991, the channel began to show the anime Macron 1.

In October 1991, a legal entity Enterprise «TV channel 2x2» was re-registered as LLP Company «TV Channel 2x2».

Since 2 July 1992, instead of the daytime show of feature films of Central television, the TV channel began to carry out reruns of series going to MTK, the first of which was "Nobody but you".

Starting around 1992, the channel began to broadcast a program about heavy and rock music "Green Corridor", produced by the production Studio "BIZ Enterprises" entrepreneur Boris Zosimov. In the future of music policy of the channel is almost entirely under the control of that person, the consequence of which in 1993 was the signing of a guide channel of a contract with the owners of the TV channel MTV Europe on the rebroadcast of some programs of the channel (for example, on the night of 1 January 1994, was shown the concert of ABBA). Initially, clips from the European broadcast of MTV were broadcast during the day between series and other programs. At first, recordings of MTV broadcasts were broadcast quite often, including VJ blocks, often even without translation. Among the programs were episodes of the animated series Beavis and Butt-Head. Soon, paid clips of Russian artists such as Vlad Stashevsky and Yevgeny Kemerovo began to take the place of MTV clips more and more. By the summer of 1994, there was a daily hour-long selection of clips from the MTV broadcast (aired in the afternoon), which soon also disappeared. Music videos, but no longer from the airwaves of MTV, were occasionally broadcast in the future, still in between the series.

Despite the fact that some of the ideas of Boris Zosimov (MTV) did not justify themselves, he continued to occupy part of the air on 2x2, creating a TV producer "BIZ-TV". Within its framework, a number of musical programs were released and, in fact, almost all the musical component of the channel was formed. Also, as part of this project, the program "Forgotten names", dedicated to the Soviet stage, was broadcast, later moved to the TV-6 channel, where it was aired as part of the program "Disk-channel" as "spinning disks". The hosts of the program were Kirill Nemolyaev.

In 1993, 2x2 first came to the satellite, which resulted in retransmission (in the recording) it is supported by some regional partners. Prior to the satellite launch, the channel broadcast only in Moscow and the Moscow region, and through its own transmitters in Tver and Ryazan, with real-time signal delivery via ground-based RRL.

In 1993–1994, 2x2 also regularly showed commercials of the organization Greenpeace, and therefore on the air of this TV channel you could often see Joanna Stingray and Boris Grebenshchikov. In 1993, newscasts "2x2" appeared (at first they were in the middle of each hour, less often-at the end of the ending hour, later-at the beginning of each hour, in the format of short news blocks). A half-hour weekly broadcast of AUM Shinrikyo was also broadcast.

From 1992 to 1994 inclusive, the channel broadcast BBC, ITN and Worldnet news in the morning and evening (until 18:00), and one of the morning editions was always broadcast without translation. The issues were translated into Russian by Peter Kartsev, a simultaneous translator of VHS, who also worked at TV-6.

In 1994, the channel had problems with the Australian television series "chances", which gradually moved from the usual melodrama to a more explicit erotic genre.

In 1994–1995, the channel reached the peak of popularity due to the diverse broadcast network and the presence of such programs as" Dandy — New reality", and such animated series as Teenage Mutant Ninja Turtles. The creative concept of the TV channel was based on the principle of "family broadcasting", designed for each family member, with their own tastes and preferences. So, entrepreneurs were addressed advertising blocks, children-cartoons and animated series, Housewives-soap operas, young people-music videos and programs. The slogan of the then 2x2 was "Just we work for You! 2x2 TV channel".

In 1995, according to opinion polls, the 1st Ostankino channel, then PRT, was significantly inferior to the 2x2 TV channel in the daytime. At the close of the old 2x2 (spring 1997) the situation with the ratings in morning and afternoon time has changed in favor of the PRT, and the average daily share of watching a channel was approximately 1% of the TV audience that was equivalent to the then indicators decimeter STS and REN TV, and then another meter of the Fifth channel; the same rating problems have been broadcast in the evening on the same button of the Moscow channel MTK.

Later, in 1996, for the first time in Russia began showing the anime Sailor Moon. The screening of telenovelas of Mexican production continued: "You or no one", "My second mother" and "Crossed roads". Such series as "Thunder in Paradise", "Highlander: The Series", "Sledge Hammer!", "Lassie" were also shown.

Broadcasting of 2x2 on 3 Chaneel ended exactly at midnight on the night of 8-9 June 1997 due to the expiration of license number 15 of 8 June 1992, issued for 5 years. 7:00 GMT on 9 June, the channel lost its place on the "third television the button" new TV channel "Moskovia" and "TV Centre", moving to the UHF band, at 51 channel, where from 7:00 to 11:00 and from 19:00 to 3:00 on weekdays and from 9:00 to 14:00 and from 19:00 to 3:00 at weekends was saying "Muz-TV" (in the printed programs were transferring, reporting directly to the Muz-TV). On 51 channel 2x2 broadcast from 11 to 19 hours-on weekdays and from 14 to 19 hours-on weekends, with extremely low-quality content and the predominance of "Shop on the couch".

On 14 August 1997, the channel stopped broadcasting to Moscow and the Moscow region on 51 channel. For a long time after the closure of the old 2x2, the company "2x2-Telemarket" existed, which was the exclusive owner of the rights to a number of films, documentaries, animated series and television series broadcast by the channel until 1997, on the territory of Russia.

AST-2x2 

The implementation of TV channel 2x2 began in August 1995 on the basis of its own network of daytime broadcasting. This project provided for the distribution of TV programs from Moscow via a satellite communication system to the entire territory of Russia, the CIS countries, and to places with a high Russian-speaking population (the Baltic States, Bulgaria, Israel, Cyprus). By mid-1996, several stages of the project were successfully completed, which made it possible to switch to broadcasting 17.5 hours a day, hard network programming, and form the basis of the network. The TV audience in Russia that received AST programs was 25 million people (214 cities and towns, excluding the Moscow region) and 24 million people in the CIS countries. After the closure of 2x2 in 1997, the channel did not disappear from the air and for some time showed news from TV Centre.

In 1998, the AST-2x2 was replaced by the Prometheus AST owned by Gazprom, which in 2002 (mainly due to the transition to Gazprom-Media of NTV and TNT TV channels, as well as the satellite operator NTV Plus) it was transformed into «ASTV» and then completely absorbed by the Rambler Internet portal. In January 2003, instead of «ASTV», the educational channel «Rambler TV» was created, whose regional broadcasting network in 2007 was transferred to the «TV channel 2x2».

2002—2007

In 2002, legal entity LLP Company TV Channel 2x2 was renamed to CJSC TV Channel 2x2-Moscow.

On 27 February 2002, 2x2 won a competition for 43 channel in Moscow with the concept of "Shop on the couch". The channel was originally scheduled to launch on November 11, 2002, but was postponed, as it turned out that the Moscow regional center (Ostankino Tower), which distributes the signal of Central TV channels, will be ready to start providing its services to the 2x2 channel only from January 2003. Then it turned out that the operation of the 2x2 transmitter on 43 channel is influenced by radio-electronic means of one of the parts of the Ministry of defense of the Russian Federation. The launch of 2x2 was postponed to January 3, 2003, but it also did not take place.

In April 2003, test tests were carried out on 44 channel, which showed that it was suitable for broadcasting, but it was launched a few years later for broadcasting the St. Petersburg "Fifth channel" in Moscow. A month later, in may, members of an interdepartmental working group composed of representatives of the Ministry of defense, the Ministry of communications and RTRS, came to the conclusion that the 2x2 channel will be allocated 60 chaneel for broadcasting. On July 7, 2003, the channel began broadcasting on 60 channel in Moscow in an experimental mode. On September 1 of the same year, the channel began to fully go on the air.

From the first days of broadcasting of the "revived" 2x2, most of the airtime of the TV channel was made up of programs of the popular TV channel about fashion "FashionTV" and clips of domestic performers produced by the production Studio "Difficult Childhood". The name of the program was named after the popular song of Vladimir Markin "Lilac fog". Legally, the new 2x2 is connected to the old TV channel, which was closed in 1997.

The new 2x2 defined its concept as "television for the active consumer", a kind of TV guide to the market of goods and services. According to the prescribed concept, 50% of the broadcasting of the "new" 2x2 channel was occupied by the retransmission of programs of the FashionTV channel. The programs of our own production were intended for a young audience. The channel was aimed at an audience under 45 years of age with an income above $300, who pay great attention to their lifestyle. In accordance with the concept, the TV channel fundamentally refused to introduce information, social, socio-political or criminal programs into its broadcasting network.

In 2004, the TV channel "Style TV" signed a long-term cooperation agreement with 2x2. In the same year, on the frequency of the TV channel, programs of the network partner — the TV channel "Style TV" with the 2x2 logo were retransmitted (interrupting the broadcast to the TV store).

By 2005–2006, there was a critical time on the channel: the TV store almost completely replaced the rest of the programs from the broadcast grid (there was no logo, screensavers indicating the media registration certificate appeared only before music videos). Basically, in the broadcast grid of the then 2x2, there were presentations of goods from the TV Club store. The broadcast of the TV store was divided into thematic categories: from kitchen goods to fitness equipment. On the night from Friday to Saturday, the channel broadcast feature films and TV series. Music videos were also broadcast on the broadcast network.

In February 2006, the 2x2 TV channel was acquired by ProfMedia holding. On October 3, 2006, the new owners presented its updated broadcasting concept.

Since 2007
On 19 March 2007 2×2 became cool. Fragments of animated series were broadcast on the 2x2 TV channel, after which the time of airing was shown, as well as a promo with the slogan "Turn off the brain, turn on 2x2!". At the bottom was the inscription "channel demo". Periodically, it was changed to the number of days remaining before the launch of a new channel.

On 1 April 2007, 2x2 was finally rebranding and the channel switched to a new broadcasting format. As a result, 2x2 underwent major changes: there was a change of management and staff; the logo and graphic design were changed. The channel began to position itself as "the first Russian animation channel for adults". The cartoons shown are translated or dubbed into Russian. Some of them airing on 2x2 have already been shown on other Russian channels, for example, "The Simpsons", "Futurama", "Family Guy", "South Park" (REN TV), "Beavis and Butt-Head", and "Celebrity Deathmatch" (MTV Russia). During the daytime, the family block is shown, showing the series which are intended exclusively for children; at night, the adult block is shown instead, for an adult audience which aires Adult Swim.

The channel also became the first to attract celebrities to voice their TV shows. So, in the translation of a number of TV series (South Park, King of the Hill, Popetown, 12 oz. Mouse, Robot Chicken, Tom Goes to the Mayor and Uncontrolled), Russian translator Dmitry "Goblin" Puchkov took part. The translation of other animated series were supervised by journalist Mikhail Kozyrev. On May 21, 2008, the premiere of the animated series Monkey Dust took place, the male roles in which were voiced by journalist Leonid Parfenov. In turn, on 13 April 2009, the animated series The Boondocks was first released in Russia, with some of its characters voiced by rappers Vasily Vakulenko (Noggano) and Denis Karpenko (QP).

For the first few months, the animated 2x2 was presented in St. Petersburg, Moscow and the Moscow region (including in the Mostelecom package", where 2x2 broadcasting was carried out since 2005), and since June its expansion into the regions began. Broadcasting of the channel in most other regions of Russia was started on the site of the closed "ProfMedia "and exhausted educational channel Rambler TV.

By the end of 2007, animated 2x2 began to achieve its first successes — in the first 2 months of autumn, it managed to increase its audience and outstrip such major channels as TNT, MTV Russia and channel One in terms of the number of youth audience. Later, 2x2 managed to attract an age group that traditionally does not watch TV — young men and those who have long been disappointed in TV.

At the end of 2007, the channel started showing some well-known anime series.

In 2008, the legal entity CJSC «TV Channel 2x2-Moscow"» was renamed into CJSC «TV and radio Company "2x2"». In 2010 — re-registered in OJSC «TV and radio Company "2x2"».

On new year's eve from 2008 to 2009, a concert with the participation of the young avant-garde composer Nikolai Voronov, who became famous in Runet for his song "White dragonfly of love", was shown on 2x2 immediately after the chimes. In addition, as part of the new year's concert, a performance of the cat trainer Vladimir Krasnolozhkin was held. On New Year's Eve, the channel could also see other artists whose performances had not previously been shown on Russian television.

In early 2009, the 2x2 office moved to Varshavskoe shosse, 9, p. 1A. Before moving there was a textile factory. In July of the same year, after the appearance of Roman Sarkisov as General Director and according to the terms of the license renewal, the channel began to develop a non-animation direction: now it also broadcasts game television series (initially in a special night block 2x2|new). Most of them are satirical or parody shows with their own special, in some sense even absurd, non-standard humor. One of the first purchased TV series was "The Wrong Door" and "Greg Rabbit".

Since the fall of 2010, the channel has been broadcasting projects of its own production, the first of which were the satirical show "Reutov TV" from the creative Association "Pismoshnaya" (previously it was not long on the related channel MTV Russia) and the author's animated series "Pykhchevo" and "Atomic forest". All three projects ceased to exist in different years for one reason or another, including as a result of the following change of ownership 2x2.

On 30 November 2010, it was announced that the channel began airing WWE RAW on February 5, 2011. The two-year contract was announced at wwe.com. The wwe management also spoke positively about the return of the demonstration of WWE programs on Russian television.

On 14 September 2012, 2x2 began satellite broadcasting with shifts of "+2 MSK " and "+5 MSK".

In February 2014, after Gazprom-Media acquired a 100% stake in ProfMedia, 2x2, along with the Friday! and TV-3 TV channels, became part of This media group. After the onset of the currency crisis in Russia, it became unprofitable for the channel's management to order author's animated series, and in November 2014, a Flash animated series from the Internet called "the whale Stupid Show"began to appear on the channel. Its Creator Kirill Dalnichenko (formerly a player of the KVN team "Four bold" from Serpukhov) previously collaborated with the channel, a year ago presenting him his other series - "Fizfak". In addition, the basis of its own production of 2x2 began to be reviews of movies, TV series and video games: "Immortal cinema", "Looking", "Level Up".

In parallel with this, 2x2 begins broadcasting the animated series "Rick and Morty" produced by Adult Swim, while purchasing an Amateur VoiceOver by video blogger Dmitry Karpov (Syenduk). Subsequently, Karpov begins to cooperate more fruitfully with the TV channel, including in terms of voice-over conducting a review program about trends in movies, video games and not only - "Epic files 2x2".

On 1 April 2014, the channel released its own app - «2х2APP».

In March 2015, after a small reorganization, the TV channel became part of the Gazprom-media entertainment Television sub-holding (GPM RTV), its office (as well as its sister channels TNT, TV-3 and Friday!) moved to the building of the Diamond Hall business center.

In June 2015, former CEO Lev Makarov said that the channel still has an archive from the old 2x2, which was closed in 1997.

On 1 January 2016, the channel ceded part of its air frequencies to the TV channel «TNT4»(before the rebranding - «TNT-Comedy»). However, the share of the channel did not change significantly, and the coverage remained also Federal and all-Russian, since in most major cities it was already retransmitted only in cable networks.

In November 2016, the channel established its own animation Studio, the creative producer of which was Kirill Danilchenko, and the General Director — Anna moryakova. The staff of the Studio included animators, screenwriters and voice actors from Serpukhov, who previously worked in the "whale Stupid Show", its products also began to be produced in the style of this animated series. Among the projects released within the Studio are "Suspicious owl", "Multv", "Burdashev" and others.

On 13 April 2017, the 2x2 satellite broadcast began with a shift of "+7 MSK " for residents of the Far East. In the same month, the double "+5 MSK" was replaced with "+4 MSK".

Since 2017, episodes of the popular YouTube series "Meet Bob" from the YouTube channel of the same name have been broadcast on the channel as inter-programs.

Since 10 April 2018, an online broadcast has appeared on the channel's website, which differs from the broadcast version by broadcasting in HD format; it is conducted for the Moscow time zone (+0).

On 6 April 2019, instead of broadcasting WWE wrestling, the channel began to purchase recorded fights of Latin American wrestlers "Lucha Underground".

On 1 November 2019, the "2x2 Media" service was launched (before that there was a " 2x2 Hub»), where for a subscription you can watch content in FULL HD and without censorship on the channel's website. Also, there are projects from Adult Swim that do not get on the air.

Since 19 March 2020, the "Bazooka video Store" program uses the 2x2 logo of the 2003-2007 model.

On 19 October 2020, the channel switched to a 16:9 broadcast format.

On 16 August 2021, the TV channel changed its logo, graphic design and broadcasting concept.

2x2.Media 

At the beginning of 2020, information regarding the launch of this platform was released.

On 8 December 2020, 2x2.Media was launched to the public. The platform explores how pop culture helps a person "grow up". 2x2.Media is distinguished by a more author's approach to materials. In addition to news, the publication also publishes longreads, special projects and curated collections. 2x2.Media tells how animation, TV series, movies, music, games and various forms of modern art have influenced and continue to influence Millennials. 2x2.Media's main slogan, "Don't grow up — it's a trap!", further supports this motive.

Controversies and criticism

As the country's largest adult-oriented animation channel, 2×2 is prone to protest among various conservative and religious groups, and occasionally with authorities. Since 'animation' as a genre was traditionally viewed as exclusively children's media in Russia, 2×2 struggles with continually highlighting that its programs are not recommended for children.

In February 2008, the Russian Media Culture Protection Department (Rossvyazokhrankultura), a regulatory body for TV in Russia, issued warnings about Happy Tree Friends and The Adventures of Big Jeff, claiming that the shows promote "violence and brutality." This "violence and brutality" was claimed to harm the psychic health, moral development and social morality of children, all of this being a violation of license agreement. The department warned 2×2, which broadcasts the shows, to remove them in order to avoid legal issues. The owners of 2×2 voiced their disagreement, but reluctantly fulfilled the request.

Later that year, activists of the Russian Pentecostalist Church criticized 2×2 for airing South Park and The Simpsons. Their appeal to close 2×2 was rejected by the Russian media officials. On September 24, 2008, the channel's license was extended for an additional 5 years.

In July 2009, 2×2 cut a scene from the episode "Free Willzyx" of South Park, because it depicted Vladimir Putin as "a greedy and desperate leader," prompting "criticism and furious discussion on Russia blogs".

Programming

References

External links 

 
2×2 at LyngSat Address

 https://play.google.com/store/apps/details?id=com.js9780289746.Russia_TV_Live

Mass media companies of Russia
Russian-language television stations in Russia
Anime television
Anime and Cartoon television
Television channels and stations established in 1989
Television channels and stations disestablished in 1997
Television channels and stations established in 2007